Augustin Chaboseau (17 June 1868 – 2 January 1946) is the original organizer and promulgation officer of the Traditional Martinist Order (TMO), Occultist and Historian.

Notably, his founding was in partnership with Papus in 1888. In his early years, he had the necessary talents, skills and abilities that led him to become a medical doctor and it was with the knowledge gained from working with the responsibility of saving people's lives that he was able to successful transition into his work with the TMO.

He has contributed to numerous journals and is the author of an essay on Buddhist philosophy (1891) and a History of Brittany before the thirteenth century (1926), World War I interior ministry.

References

French occultists
20th-century French historians
1868 births
1946 deaths
French male non-fiction writers
19th-century French historians
19th-century French physicians